Jenyns is a surname. Notable persons with that name include:

Bob Jenyns (born 1944), Australian artist
Essie Jenyns (1864–1920), Australian stage actress
John Jenyns ( 1660–1717), English politician
Leonard Jenyns, (1800–1893), English clergyman, author and naturalist
Soame Jenyns (1704–1787), English writer
Stephen Jenyns( 1450–1523), English politician